St. John's Parish was created as a civil parish in Queens County, Prince Edward Island, Canada, during the 1764–1766 survey of Samuel Holland.

It contains the following townships:

 Lot 50
 Lot 57
 Lot 58
 Lot 60
 Lot 62

Parishes of Prince Edward Island
Geography of Queens County, Prince Edward Island